Ettleton is a village near Castleton, in the Scottish Borders area of Scotland, in the former Roxburghshire.

Etymology and history

Ettleton Parish was once also known as, or contained, Dinwiddie. The first element of this name appears to be the Cumbric word din, meaning 'fort'. Ettleton Cemetery, on the slopes of Ettleton Sike, is the burial place of many members of Clan Armstrong. Other places nearby include Newcastleton.

See also
List of places in the Scottish Borders
List of places in Scotland

References
 Brooke, C J (2000), Safe sanctuaries: security and defence in Anglo-Scottish border churches 1290-1690, Edinburgh, pages 125, 201, 236–237, 362, held at RCAHMS
 Roy, W (1747–55) Military Survey of Scotland
 Elliot, G.A., Fugitives' graves in Ettleton and Castleton Churchyards, and the Armstrong Cross, in 'Berwickshire Naturalists' Club History for 1965', XXXVII, pt.1. (1966) pp54–7

External links
CANMORE/RCAHMS record of Ettleton Cemetery
CANMORE/RCAHMS record of Ettleton Sike; Kirk Hill; Side
RCAHMS record of Ettleton
The Scottish War Graves Project: Ettleton Old Churchyard, nr Newcastleton
The Armstrong Clan Society
Scottish Borders Council: Around Newcastleton
Geograph image: Ettleton Cemetery near to Newcastleton

Villages in the Scottish Borders